Idaea eugeniata is a moth in the family Geometridae. It is found in Italy, France, Andorra, Spain, Portugal and North Africa.

The wingspan is 21–22 mm for males and 24–25 mm for females.

The larvae are polyphagous and have been recorded feeding on various herbaceous plants.

Subspecies
Idaea eugeniata eugeniata
Idaea eugeniata algeriaca (Culot, 1917)

References

External links

Lepiforum.de

Moths described in 1870
Sterrhini
Moths of Europe
Moths of Africa